Bark cloth may refer to:

Barkcloth, made from tree bark in Asia, Africa, and the Pacific; also a variety of cotton cloth
Cedar bark textile, used by indigenous people in the Pacific Northwest
Tapa cloth, a cloth made from the bark of the paper mulberry tree
Amate, a Mesoamerican bark paper, typically made with the bark of fig (ficus) trees
Other textiles made from tree bark, such as the bark cloth of the Baganda people of Uganda and lacebark, a textile made from the inner bark of the Lagetta lagetto tree